The Bruchwegstadion is a multi-purpose stadium in Mainz, Germany.  It is currently used mostly for football matches. The stadium is able to hold 18,700 people and was built in 1929. It was the home stadium of Bundesliga club Mainz 05 before being replaced by Opel Arena in 2011, known then as "Coface Arena."" It is currently used for youth football matches of Mainz 05.

References

Bruchwegstadion
Multi-purpose stadiums in Germany
1. FSV Mainz 05
Sports venues in Rhineland-Palatinate
Buildings and structures in Mainz